Fatih is a 2013 Turkish historical television drama series  based on the life of Ottoman emperor Mehmed II. The series was broadcast on Kanal D and consisted of only 5 episodes.

Characters

References

Television series about Islam
2013 Turkish television series debuts
Turkish drama television series
Television series about the Ottoman Empire
Serial drama television series
2013 Turkish television series endings
Television series set in the 15th century
Kanal D original programming
Cultural depictions of Mehmed the Conqueror
Television series produced in Istanbul
Television shows set in Istanbul